The 2021 Open du Pays d'Aix was a professional tennis tournament played on clay courts. It was the eighth edition of the tournament which was part of the 2021 ATP Challenger Tour. It took place in Aix-en-Provence, France between 14 and 20 June 2021.

Singles main-draw entrants

Seeds

 1 Rankings as of 31 May 2021.

Other entrants
The following players received wildcards into the singles main draw:
  Arthur Cazaux
  Kyrian Jacquet
  Matteo Martineau

The following players received entry into the singles main draw as alternates:
  Javier Barranco Cosano
  Geoffrey Blancaneaux
  Agustín Velotti

The following players received entry from the qualifying draw:
  Aziz Dougaz
  Titouan Droguet
  Oriol Roca Batalla
  Nikolás Sánchez Izquierdo

The following player received entry as a lucky loser:
  Oscar José Gutierrez

Champions

Singles

 Carlos Taberner def.  Manuel Guinard 6–2, 6–2.

Doubles

  Sadio Doumbia /  Fabien Reboul def.  Robert Galloway /  Alex Lawson 6–7(4–7), 7–5, [10–4].

References

2021 ATP Challenger Tour
2021
2021 in French tennis
June 2021 sports events in France